Acresford is a hamlet in North West Leicestershire, it shares civil parish authorities with Donisthorpe and Oakthorpe  and forms part of the border with South Derbyshire. Located in the settlement is an abandoned quarry.

External links
Parish Council

Hamlets in Leicestershire
North West Leicestershire District